The Flaming Lips with Neon Indian is an extended play by American rock band the Flaming Lips and American electronic music band Neon Indian. It was released on March 23, 2011 as part of The Flaming Lips 2011 series of monthly music releases. The 12-inch EP was a limited release pressed on special colored vinyl and distributed to select record stores in the United States. The song "Is David Bowie Dying?" was later included on the 2012 album The Flaming Lips and Heady Fwends.

Background
Neon Indian frontman Alan Palomo met Flaming Lips lead vocalist Wayne Coyne during a show in Portland, Oregon: "He was like 'hey, man, we should do something!' We didn't know exactly what it was going to be; maybe we'd play some shows together, maybe we'd make some music. We just kept in contact, and by the time I was in the studio with Fridmann, the Lips had a couple of extra days lined up to record there that were overlapping, then Wayne said 'why don’t we show up a couple of days early, we'll fuck around in the studio and see what happens?' And, sure enough, the songs we made all came out of that period".

Critical reception

Reviews of The Flaming Lips with Neon Indian were positive. Marc Masters of Pitchfork gave the EP a rating of 7.4 out of 10.

Track listing

Personnel
Credits adapted from the liner notes of The Flaming Lips with Neon Indian.

 Derek Brown – performer
 Wayne Coyne – performer
 Steven Drozd – performer
 The Flaming Lips – production
 Dave Fridmann – production
 Michael Ivins – performer
 Alan Palomo – performer
 George Salisbury – design, layout
 Kliph Scurlock – performer

References

2011 EPs
Albums produced by Dave Fridmann
Collaborative albums
The Flaming Lips EPs
Neon Indian albums
Warner Records EPs
Albums recorded at Tarbox Road Studios